Bâlvănești is a commune located in Mehedinți County, Romania. It is composed of five villages: Bâlvănești, Bâlvăneștii de Jos, Călineștii de Jos, Călineștii de Sus and Pârlagele. It is situated in the historical region of Oltenia.

References

Communes in Mehedinți County
Localities in Oltenia